Kannada Brahmins are Kannada-speaking Brahmins, primarily living in Karnataka, although a few of them have settled in other states like, Telangana, Andhra Pradesh, Kerala and Tamil Nadu. They belong to one of the three main sects: Smartism, Sadh Vaishnavism (Madhva Sampradaya), and Sri Vaishnavism and are followers of Shankaracharya, Madhwacharya and Ramanujacharya respectively. Madhva Brahmins are also called Sadh Vaishnavas and Madhwas. Sri Vaishnava Brahmins are also called Iyengars and Ramanujas.

Classification
Kannada Brahmins fall under the Pancha Dravida Brahmin classification of the Brahmin community in India. Brahmins generally are further sub-divided into a number of Gotras and the Veda Shakha which professes to follow in the performance of the yagna and rites. In Karnataka, there are as many Rig Vedis as there are Yajur and Sama Vedis together. There are none apparently who acknowledge adhesion to the Atharva Veda. They are also further divided into those who follow the Apastamba Dharmasutra and Asvalayana Sutra. The latter seems to preponderate in the state.

References

Bibliography
 

Brahmin communities across India
Kannada Brahmins
Hindu denominations
Social groups of Karnataka
Brahmin communities of Karnataka